is a Japanese football player. He plays for Ventforet Kofu.

Career
Keita Irumagawa joined J1 League club Ventforet Kofu in 2017.

Club statistics
Updated to 22 February 2018.

References

External links
 
 Profile at Ventforet Kofu
 

1999 births
Living people
Association football people from Yamanashi Prefecture
Japanese footballers
J2 League players
J3 League players
Ventforet Kofu players
AC Nagano Parceiro players
Association football defenders